The following is a discography of Moguai, a German electronic dance music musician.

Albums

Singles 
Sources:

Remixes 
Sources:

Compilations

Sample packs

References

Discographies of German artists
Electronic music discographies